Iconolatry (Greek: εἰκών, eikon, 'picture or image', + λατρεία, latreia, 'veritable (full) worship or adoration') designates the idolatric worship or adoration of icons. In the history of Christianity, iconolatry was manifested mainly in popular worship, as a superstitious belief in the divine nature of icons. It was practiced as a direct adoration of icons, and other objects representing various saints, angels and the God. One of extreme practices of iconolatry was scraping parts of icons into the Holy Communion.

Iconolatry is the opposite of iconoclasm, and also should not be confused with iconophilia, designating the moderate veneration of icons. Both extreme positions, iconolatry and iconoclasm, were rejected in 787 by the Second Council of Nicaea, being the seventh Ecumenical Council. The Council decided that holy icons should not be destroyed, as was advocated and practiced by the Byzantine iconoclasm, nor veritable (full) worshiped or adored, as was practiced by iconolatry, but to be only venerated as symbolic representations of God, angels, or saints.

Overview
Icon in Greek simply denotes a picture but has now come to be closely associated with religious art used by the Eastern Orthodox and Roman Catholic Churches. Icons are used by Orthodox Churches to assist in prayer and worship of God.

The Eastern Orthodox Church (while finally reinstating the icons) held at least two Church councils to decide on the proper use of icons.  The Council of Hieria in 754 expressly forbade the making of icons, and ordered all pictures of Jesus and the saints to be removed from the churches, saying that they ought instead to be decorated with pictures of birds, flowers, and fruit. This council was held near Constantinople, and all attending bishops were from the Constantinople Patriarchate. The other patriarchs refused to send any delegates.

The Second Council of Nicaea held in 787 reversed the decisions of that council. This Council of Church leaders (bishops) was a key step towards an alternate understanding of the use of religious art in the Church. An early Church council defined veneration of icons based on the sacred mystery of the incarnation of Jesus Christ. The Person of Jesus was thought to reveal not only the Word of God, but the image of God. Pre-Christian scriptures defined idolatry as worshipping of false gods. Church leaders defended images of Christ on the basis that they were representations of the true incarnation of God and clarified the relationship between an image and the one depicted by the image. The principle of respected worship is that, in honoring an image, the honor is to paid not to the image itself, but the one who is portrayed. After the period of Iconoclasm was over, respected veneration of icons spread to Serbia, Bulgaria, and to distant Russia.

Depictions of icons bearing the image of God the Father were forbidden in the Orthodox Church, unless depicted in the context of the Revelation or Apocalypse of Saint John, where God the Father is described as an older version of Jesus. Some prefer the depiction of God in the icon type of Rublev's Holy Trinity.  Others believe that, as no-one has ever seen God the Father, he should never be depicted in icons, while Jesus, who was seen by human eyes, is allowed to be pictured.

See also
 Religious images in Christian theology
 Aniconism in Christianity
 Iconodulism
 Veneration
 Latria

References

Christian terminology
Heresy in Christianity
Byzantine Iconoclasm